Novoselovsky Lesouchastok is a rural locality (a settlement) in Stepanovskoye Rural Settlement, Kudymkarsky District, Perm Krai, Russia. The population was 42 as of 2010. There are 2 streets.

Geography 
Novoselovsky Lesouchastok is located 14 km south of Kudymkar (the district's administrative centre) by road. Kekur is the nearest rural locality.

References 

Rural localities in Kudymkarsky District